Joseph Ulysse Edgar Rochette (April 28, 1890 – June 15, 1953) was a Canadian lawyer, judge, and provincial politician.

Born in La Malbaie, Quebec, Rochette was admitted to the Quebec Bar in 1914. A Rhodes Scholar, he studied law at Pembroke College, Oxford, from 1914 to 1917. He also spent time at the University of Grenoble.

He was a member of the Legislative Assembly of Quebec for Charlevoix-Saguenay from 1927 to 1936 and from 1939 to 1944. He held various cabinet positions including Minister of Labour, Minister of Labour, Games and Fisheries, and Minister of Mines and Fisheries. In 1944, he was made a judge.

References

1890 births
1953 deaths
Alumni of Pembroke College, Oxford
Canadian Rhodes Scholars
Judges in Quebec
Lawyers in Quebec
People from Capitale-Nationale
Quebec Liberal Party MNAs
Université Laval alumni